The Regional Council of Abruzzo (Consiglio Regionale dell'Abruzzo) is the legislative assembly of Abruzzo.

It was first elected in 1970, when the ordinary regions were instituted, on the basis of the Constitution of Italy of 1948.

Composition
The Regional Council of Abruzzo was originally composed of 40 regional councillors. The number of regional councillors increased to 43 in the 2000 regional election and, subsequently, to 45 in the 2008 regional election.

Following the decree-law n. 138 of 13 August 2011 the number of regional councillors was reduced to 30, with an additional seat reserved for the President of the Region.

Political groups in XI legislature
The Regional Council of Abruzzo in XI legislature was composed of the following political groups:

See also
Regional council
Politics of Abruzzo
President of Abruzzo

References

External links
Regional Council of Abruzzo

1970 establishments in Italy
Politics of Abruzzo
Italian Regional Councils
Abruzzo